Americana: Dispatches from the New Frontier is a 2004 collection of non-fiction essays compiled by American historian and author Hampton Sides. The book was published in paperback on April 13, 2004, through Doubleday.

Summary
The book consists of several essays that Sides wrote while traveling through the United States and examining American cultures during a period of 15 years. Sides pays specific attention to subcultures that would fall under the topic of "Americana".

Reviews 

Westword gave a favorable opinion of Americana, writing "Engendered by a crack facility for vivid, pictorial prose, [Sides] invites readers into each story with him." The San Francisco Chronicle was also favorable, stating "Much of the collection's charm rests in its gallivanting, "road trip" narrative form, with stops across the map, as Sides gathers the odd-fitting pieces that, once assembled, best define "Americana.""

References

2004 non-fiction books
American travel books